The 1994–95 Sri Lankan cricket season featured a Test series with Sri Lanka playing against Pakistan.

Honours
 P Saravanamuttu Trophy – Sinhalese Sports Club and Bloomfield Cricket and Athletic Club shared the title
 Hatna Trophy – no competition
 Most runs – MS Atapattu 1302 @ 93.00 (HS 181)
 Most wickets – SD Anurasiri 78 @ 15.67 (BB 8-90)

Test series
Pakistan won the Test series 2-0:
 1st Test @ Paikiasothy Saravanamuttu Stadium, Colombo – Pakistan won by 301 runs
 2nd Test @ Asgiriya Stadium, Kandy – Pakistan won by an innings and 52 runs
 3rd Test @ Sinhalese Sports Club Ground, Colombo – game abandoned

External sources
  CricInfo – brief history of Sri Lankan cricket
 CricketArchive – Tournaments in Sri Lanka

Further reading
 Wisden Cricketers' Almanack 1995

Sri Lankan cricket seasons from 1972–73 to 1999–2000